Pivnice is a village located in the Bačka Palanka municipality, in the South Bačka District of Serbia. It is situated in the Autonomous Province of Vojvodina. The population of the village numbering 3,835 people (2002 census), of whom 2,935 are ethnic Slovaks.

Name
The name of the settlement in Serbian is plural.

Historical population

1961: 5,541
1971: 5,162
1981: 4,820
1991: 4,361

See also
List of places in Serbia
List of cities, towns and villages in Vojvodina

References
Slobodan Ćurčić, Broj stanovnika Vojvodine, Novi Sad, 1996.

External links 

Pivnice

Bačka Palanka
Places in Bačka
South Bačka District
Slovak communities in Serbia